Donato Álvarez (1825 – September 23, 1913) was an Argentine general. He fought in the battle of Vuelta de Obligado under the command of Lucio Mansilla. He joined Justo José de Urquiza in his conflict against Juan Manuel de Rosas, and fought in the battle of Caseros. He also fought in the Paraguayan War and the Conquest of the Desert. He died in Buenos Aires on September 23, 1913.

Argentine generals
Federales (Argentina)
1825 births
1913 deaths
Burials at La Recoleta Cemetery